Kodi is a Sumba language of Indonesia. The population figure may include Gaura, which Ethnologue counts as a dialect of both the Lamboya and Kodi languages. Kodi is an Austronesian language that is mainly spoken in Nusa Tenggara Timur province, the western part of the island of Sumba in eastern Indonesia. An alternate name for Kodi is Kudi and dialects of the language include Kodi Bokol, Kodi Bangedo, Nggaro (Nggaura) and is most alike to Wejewa. With only approximately 20,000 speakers, the Kodi language is an endangered language.

Classification 
Austronesian, Malayo-Polynesian, Central-Eastern Malayo-Polynesian, Sumba-Hawu, Sumba, Kodi-Gaura.

History 
The Kodi language is derived from the Melanesian and Austronesian languages since its inhabitants arrived in Sumba in the 1500s. The Kodi society can be described as "isolated from history" since being colonized by the Dutch empire during the 1800s. The Kodi people live remotely in West Sumba located in Eastern Indonesia without a political leader.

Geographic distribution 
Kodi is spoken in Nusa Tenggara Timur Province; west Sumba located in Eastern Indonesia.

Dialects/varieties 
Kodi has a population of approximately 20,000 speakers. Other known names and dialects of Kodi include: Kodi Bangedo, Kodi Bokol, Kudi, Nggaro, and Nggaura. May be most similar to Wejewa.

Sound system 
Global Recordings Network has a short biblical story spoken in the Kodi language.

Vocabulary 
 – 'returning the honor'

 – 'renown' (lit. 'name')

 – 'honor'

 – 'the feet of the moon'

 – 'the hand of the sun'

References

External links
Pasola Desa Ratenggaro, Kec. Kodi Bangedo – Sumba Barat Daya – Video of Kodi thanksgiving ceremony with Kodi-language audio

Sumba languages
Languages of Indonesia